Anthela binotata is a moth of the Anthelidae family. The type location is Peak Down.

References

Moths described in 1886
Anthelidae